Enteromius nigroluteus is a species of ray-finned fish in the genus Enteromius which is endemic to the Congo.

Footnotes 

 

Endemic fauna of the Republic of the Congo
Enteromius
Taxa named by Jacques Pellegrin
Fish described in 1930